Kavuthiyar is caste south India in kerala (also known as kavudiyaru or kavutiyya) They are barbers who serve the Thiyya community. They are also sometimes given the title Kurup. They are found in all regions of Kerala but their main habitat is Malabar. Some of them sometimes perform puja rituals. They bear the lowest saga of the Thiyya caste. Today the Kerala government has considered them as a special caste under the OBC category.

References

Indian castes